Acanthus spinosus, the spiny bear's breech, is a species of flowering plant in the family Acanthaceae, native to southern Europe, from Italy to western Turkey.

It is thought that both A. spinosus and its close relative A. mollis were introduced to Britain as ornamental and herbal plants from the Mediterranean in Roman times. It has been intermittently cultivated ever since, and is now a regular feature of the herbaceous border.  For centuries, stone or bronze stylized versions of acanthus leaves have appeared as decoration on certain styles of architecture and furniture.

References

spinosus
Plants described in 1753
Taxa named by Carl Linnaeus
Flora of Malta